Blood is a 2015 South Korean television series starring Ahn Jae-hyun, Ji Jin-hee, Koo Hye-sun, and Son Soo-hyun. It aired on KBS2 from February 16 to April 21, 2015 on Mondays and Tuesdays at 22:00 for 20 episodes.

Plot
Park Ji-sang (Ahn Jae-hyun)  is a doctor specializing in hepato-pancreato-biliary surgery in the best cancer research hospital in the country. He is also a vampire. Despite seeming cold and unfeeling, Ji-sang masks his soft heart and inner pain and yearns for closeness with people. He believes very strongly in the sanctity of human life, and suppresses his thirst for blood to treat terminally ill patients and save lives. Among his colleagues is Yoo Ri-ta (Ku Hye-sun), a hotshot physician who entered medical school at the age of 17 and is also the niece of the chaebol group chairman who owns the hospital. Ri-ta is highly capable but snooty and arrogant, yet Ji-sang finds himself falling for her. He also gets drawn into a conflict between good and evil as he encounters Lee Jae-wook, a two-faced hospital director who gains everyone's trust with his gentle demeanor, but inwardly harbors a dangerous ambition for power and a talent for cruelty.

Cast

Main
Ahn Jae-hyun as Park Ji-sang/Jason Park
Baek Seung-hwan as young Ji-sang
a very handsome and talented hepato-pancreato-biliary surgeon and medical researcher in Taemin Hospital. Ji-sang is a vampire, being an infectee of the VBT-01 virus he inherited from his infected (vampire) parents. Though cold and indifferent on the outside, Ji-sang is soft and caring on the inside, bearing the pain of losing his parents who were killed by the evil infectee Jae-wook. He believes very strongly in the sanctity of human life, and suppresses his thirst for blood to treat terminally ill patients and save lives. He falls for fellow surgeon and childhood acquaintance Yoo Ri-ta.
Ji Jin-hee as Lee Jae-wook
an evil vampire/VBT-01 infectee who harbors a dangerous ambition for power and a talent for cruelty. Along with Ji-sang's parents, he was a mentee and fellow researcher of Dr. Jung Han-su, the discoverer of the VBT-01 virus. Seeing the virus' potential in human enhancement, he plans to extend the research, to which Dr. Jung and the other mentees strongly disagree for ethical considerations. Blinded by greed, he infects himself with the virus, kills Dr. Jung, and sends his men to hunt Ji-sang parents. He becomes the director of Taemin Hospital, gaining everyone's trust with his gentle demeanor and using the hospital to continue his research on VBT-01.
Koo Hye-sun as Yoo Ri-ta/Yoo Chae-eun
Jung Chan-bi as young Chae-eun
a highly capable but arrogant surgeon of Taemin Hospital. Born as Yoo Chae-eun, she lost her parents in a trip to Jeju. There, she is saved by Ji-sang from a pack of wolves. Suffering the pain of her parents' deaths, she adopts her current name Ri-ta. She had entered medical school at the age of 17 and is also the niece of the chaebol group chairman who owns the hospital. She meets Ji-sang at Taemin Hospital, though she does not recognize him and is annoyed by his presence.
Son Soo-hyun as Min Ga-yeon
first-year resident at Taemin Hospital and Ji-sang's subordinate. She secretly works under Jae-wook, who had saved her from dying by turning her into a vampire and became her father figure.

Supporting
Taemin Hospital people
Kim Kap-soo as Yoo Seok-joo
Ri-ta's chaebol uncle and chairman of Taemin Hospital
Jin Kyung as Choi Kyung-in
 vice-chairperson of Taemin Hospital
Jung Hye-sung as Choi Soo-eun
Ri-ta's best friend and mentee of Jung Ji-tae
Kim Yu-seok as Jung Ji-tae
chief of the hematology department of Taemin Hospital; son of VBT-01 discoverer Jung Han-su
Jo Jae-yoon as Woo Il-nam
Jung Suk-yong as Lee Ho-yong
Gong Jung-hwan as Gerard Kim
Park Jun-myun as Lee Young-joo

People around Jae-wook
Park Young-rin as Seo Hye-ri
a human being who wants to be a vampire works as director of Jae-wook's drug development research using the VBT-01 virus
Kwon Hyun-sang as Nam Chul-hoon
 a vampire; one of Jae-wook's henchmen
Lee Ji-hoon as J
a vampire;  one of Jae-wook's henchmen
Kang Sung-min as Joo In-ho
a vampire; he replaced Seo Hye-ri as director Jae-wook's drug development research

Others
Jung Hae-in as Joo Hyun-woo
a medical researcher and Ji-sang's close friend
Nam Myung-ryul as Jung Han-su
a renowned medical researcher and father of hematology doctor Jung Ji-tae. He discovered the VBT-01 virus, which gives vampiric traits to anyone who is infected. Though the virus can extend life and give superhuman powers to its infectees, he stops his research for the virus's potential as a source of evil and chaos, to which his former mentee Jae-wook is vehemently against. He is killed by Jae-wook, who had infected himself with the virus to his personal gain.
Ryu Soo-young as Park Hyun-seo
Ji-sang's father. Along with his wife Sun-young and Jae-wook, he is a mentee and fellow researcher of Dr. Jung Han-su. A vampire/VBT-01 infectee, he and Sun-young were against Jae-wook's plan in using the virus in human enhancement. He is killed by Jae-wook who raided the couple's house in search for the baby Ji-sang.
Park Joo-mi as Han Sun-young
Ji-sang's mother. Along with her husband Hyun-se and Jae-wook, she is a mentee and fellow researcher of Dr. Jung Han-su. A vampire/VBT-01 infectee, she was also against Jae-wook's plan in using the virus in human enhancement. She escaped to Jeju with the baby Ji-sang when Jae-wook raided their house in search for the child. She was killed later on by Jae-wook's henchmen.
Son Sook as Sylvia Ahn
an old nun who became Ri-ta/Chae-eun's mother figure. She was the one who gave Ri-ta her second name.
Ahn Ji-hwan as voice of Luuvy
 an AI robot invented by Hyun-woo

Original soundtrack

Part 1

Part 2

Part 3

Part 4

Ratings

Awards and nominations

Notes

See also
List of vampire television series

References

External links
  
 
 

2015 South Korean television series debuts
2015 South Korean television series endings
Korean Broadcasting System television dramas
Vampires in television
South Korean fantasy television series
South Korean medical television series
South Korean thriller television series
Television series about vampires
Television series by IOK Media